Perry Township is one of eight townships in Vanderburgh County, Indiana, United States.  As of the 2010 census, its population was 25,092 and it contained 10,678 housing units. The University of Southern Indiana Campus is located in Perry Township.

Perry Township was organized in 1840.

Geography

Cities and towns
 Evansville (west edge)

Unincorporated towns
 Belknap
 Mud Center
 Red Bank

Adjacent townships
 Indiana
 Vanderburgh County
 German Township (North)
 Center Township (Northeast)
 Pigeon Township (East)
 Union Township (South)
 Posey County
 Marrs Township (West)
 Robinson Township (Single Point)

Cemeteries
The township contains these three cemeteries: Memorial Park, Putman and Saint Joseph.

Lakes
 Woodland Lake

Education

School districts
 Evansville-Vanderburgh School Corporation

Postsecondary institutions
 University of Southern Indiana

Political districts
 Indiana's 8th congressional district
 State House District 76
 State Senate District 49
 State Senate District 50

References
 
 United States Census Bureau 2007 TIGER/Line Shapefiles
 IndianaMap

External links

Townships in Vanderburgh County, Indiana
Townships in Indiana